St Denys is a partially riverside district of Southampton, England, centred  north north-east of the city centre facing variously Bitterne Park and quay across the River Itchen estuary. The river is here spanned in the mid-east extreme of the district by Cobden Bridge, one of five within the city's broad boundaries, six including the railway bridge 100 m south.  It is separated from the city centre by the districts sometimes known as Bevois Valley and New Town, in turn.

History

The far south has evidence of a Roman river crossing to Clausentum on the east of the river, and certain finds of other Roman archaeology.

The area is named after the 12th-century St. Denys Priory, of minor wealth and size, of which little remains, aside from an archway of the original chapel spanning two back gardens, and a counterpart moved to beside the rear wall of King John's Palace at Tudor House Museum in the city centre.

St Denys consisted of a very small hamlet nucleus and scattered farms throughout the medieval period.  Drains and dykes improved the land for habitation and crop agriculture over many centuries.

19th century and later

The land here was extensively developed at low-rise level from the mid-19th century to the early 20th century; by 1895 it had a quite dense grid of streets which preceded most of the larger area west of the north-south railway line, namely Portswood, apart from its main road.

A history of large laundries provided employment, servicing Southampton's ocean liners until the late 20th century.  A number of homes of Titanic (sank 1912) victims and survivors are in St Denys. Considerable bombing in the Southampton Blitz due to proximity to the railway connecting London and docks.

Demography
The area is populated with a wide mix of younger working families, older residents and students.

A small community of houseboats is moored along the easterly border, the waterfront, conversions from World War II motor torpedo boats.

Landmarks

Church
The church was built in 1868, designed by George Gilbert Scott and is a listed building in the initial category; the parish dates from the previous year, its patron is and remains the Bishop of Winchester. The stained glass windows have been restored, and the congregation of the early 21st century holds events in church rooms and gardens.

Industry
The area is bounded in part by sewage treatment works built on former salt meadows, supplementing another for the west side of the city.

Boundaries
Church parishes and local government ward(s) history
St Denys is bounded by the estuary (east), a mainline railway (west), the far side of buildings on the north side of the start of Kent Road (north) and the A335 bypass, which when built in the late 20th century meant removing part of the original parish. Today the area is roughly equivalent to a third of the ward of Portswood; it remains a whole ecclesiastical parish in the Church of England. In the Catholic Church it is grouped with Portswood to the north into a parish.

Public transport

The area is connected by a minor passenger stop on the site of a junction with the coastal line to Portsmouth or Brighton of the South West Main Line. The area is connected by a high-frequency timetable of buses to Southampton city centre, including its railway station, where the mainline continues to Weymouth.

Gallery

References

Areas of Southampton